Norton Museum or Norton Gallery may refer to:
 Norton Museum of Art, West Palm Beach, Florida
 Norton Simon Museum, Pasadena, California
 R. W. Norton Art Gallery, a museum in Shreveport, Louisiana

See also
 Chipping Norton Museum, Chipping Norton, Oxfordshire, England
 Presley Norton Museum (Museo Presley Norton), Guayaquil, Ecuador